Wyoming Highway 139 (WYO 139) is a short  spur route of Wyoming Highway 135 in south-central Fremont County.

Route description
Wyoming Highway 139 begins at Wyoming Highway 135 and travels into the small oil community of Sand Draw. Highway 139 ends at an unmarked 3-way intersection in Sand Draw 1.45 miles later.

Major intersections

References

External links 

Wyoming State Routes 100-199
WYO 139 - WYO 135 to Sand Draw

Transportation in Fremont County, Wyoming
139